Edith Campbell is a Canadian judge serving on the Yukon Territory Supreme Court. She was appointed on March 15, 2018 and was sworn-in on June 21, 2018.

References 

Living people
Canadian judges
Year of birth missing (living people)